UFC 51: Super Saturday was a mixed martial arts event held by the Ultimate Fighting Championship on February 5, 2005 (Super Bowl weekend) at the Mandalay Bay Events Center in Las Vegas, Nevada. The event was broadcast live on pay-per-view in the United States and Canada, and later released on DVD.

History
Loretta Hunt, news editor for Sherdog.com, reports, "I know for a fact the UFC was considering a female bout between Erica Montoya and the late Shelby Walker a few years ago."  About this planned but never realized fight, "Big Dog" Benny Henderson Jr. asked Shelby Walker, "It has been rumored that you may fight Erika Montoya at UFC 51, is there any truth to those rumors?" Walker replied, "Yeah there is truth to those rumors, it has been talked about a lot and when I asked Dana White if he was going to put us on the show he said possibly, so that is where
it stands right now. I haven’t heard anything more from this but my biggest dream would be to fight in the UFC."

The event was also to be held in Japan, but UFC President Dana White moved it back to Las Vegas. Headlining the card were fan favorites Tito Ortiz and Vitor Belfort.

This was the last UFC event to feature a non-title matchup as the main event instead of an also-scheduled title fight on the same card until UFC 196.

Results

See also
 Ultimate Fighting Championship
 List of UFC champions
 List of UFC events
 2005 in UFC

References

External links
UFC 51: Super Saturday Results on Sherdog.com
"Ultimate Fighting Championship Cards" on Wrestling Information Archives
Full Breakdown of UFC 51 Fighter Salaries

Ultimate Fighting Championship events
2005 in mixed martial arts
Mixed martial arts in Las Vegas
2005 in sports in Nevada